Walter Armstrong, III (born June 19, 1945) is an American professional golfer who played on the PGA Tour during the 1970s and 1980s.

Armstrong was born in New London, Connecticut.  He attended the University of Florida in Gainesville, Florida, where he played for coach Buster Bishop's Florida Gators men's golf team in National Collegiate Athletic Association (NCAA) competition from 1965 to 1967.  Armstrong received All-American honors in 1966.  He graduated from the University of Florida with a bachelor's degree in physical education in 1968, and master's degree in public health in 1969.

Armstrong played on the PGA Tour from 1974 to 1984. His best finishes were a trio of second places: a tie for second at the 1974 Sahara Invitational, second at the 1975 Pensacola Open, and a second-place tie at the 1977 Western Open. His best finish in a major was a fifth-place tie at the 1978 Masters Tournament. His 280 total in 1978 was a record low for a first-time Masters participant.

Armstrong also played a few Nike Tour and Senior PGA Tour events in 1995 and 1996.

In his post-playing career, Armstrong is a golf instructor and author.

Professional wins (1)

Other wins (1)
1973 Indiana Open

Results in major championships

CUT = missed the half-way cut
"T" indicates a tie for a place

See also

1973 PGA Tour Qualifying School graduates
1982 PGA Tour Qualifying School graduates
List of Florida Gators men's golfers on the PGA Tour
List of University of Florida alumni

References

External links

American male golfers
Florida Gators men's golfers
PGA Tour golfers
Golfers from Connecticut
Golfers from Florida
Sportspeople from New London, Connecticut
People from Maitland, Florida
1945 births
Living people